"Una Voz en el Alma" (English: A Voice in the Soul) is a song performed by Puerto Rican-American singer Millie Corretjer (credited simply as Millie) from his third studio album  Amar Es un Juego  (1999). It was released as the lead single by EMI Latin
on December 14, 1998 and became her first #1 on the Latin Pop Airplay chart in the US. El Norte Deborah Davis gave the song a positive review, citing it along with "Llora Por Él" where the singer "uses all her interpretive resources to shine brightly." It was recognized as one of the best-performing songs of the year at the ASCAP Latin Awards under the pop/ballad category in 2000.

Charts

Weekly charts

Year-end charts

See also 
List of Billboard Latin Pop Airplay number ones of 1999

References

1998 singles
1998 songs
Millie Corretjer songs
1990s ballads
Latin ballads
Pop ballads
Spanish-language songs
Songs written by Rudy Pérez
Song recordings produced by Rudy Pérez
EMI Latin singles